Beaver Dam Plantation House is a historic plantation house located near Davidson, Mecklenburg County, North Carolina. It was built in 1829, and is a two-story, four bay, single pile Federal style dwelling. It has gable roof, brick exterior end chimneys, and a one-story, full-width, shed roof porch.  It was the home of William Lee Davidson, Jr., son of William Lee Davidson and the people he enslaved to work the plantation. It was also the site of the committee meeting of the Concord Presbytery in April 1835, during which the location of Davidson College was determined.

It was listed on the National Register of Historic Places in 1979.

References

Plantation houses in North Carolina
Houses on the National Register of Historic Places in North Carolina
Federal architecture in North Carolina
Houses completed in 1829
Houses in Charlotte, North Carolina
National Register of Historic Places in Mecklenburg County, North Carolina